John Randolph Chambliss Sr. (March 4, 1809 – April 3, 1875) was a Virginia plantation owner and politician who served in the Confederate House of Representatives during the American Civil War. His son, Brigadier General John R. Chambliss Jr., a cavalryman, was killed during the war.

Chambliss was born in Sussex County, Virginia. He attended the Winchester Law School and passed the bar exam, establishing a profitable practice near his home. He became a wealthy plantation owner. He served as a delegate to the Virginia state constitutional convention in 1850–51. An ardent supporter of states rights, he was the delegate from Greensville and Sussex counties to the Virginia secession convention in 1861. He was subsequently elected to the First Confederate Congress.

After the war, he retired from politics and returned to his home to again practice law. He was interred in the family graveyard near Emporia, Virginia.

References and links

  Political Graveyard

1809 births
1875 deaths
Members of the Confederate House of Representatives from Virginia
19th-century American politicians
People from Sussex County, Virginia
Virginia lawyers
Virginia Secession Delegates of 1861
19th-century American lawyers
Winchester Law School alumni